The 1967 All-Big Ten Conference football team consists of American football players chosen by various organizations for All-Big Ten Conference teams for the 1967 Big Ten Conference football season. Five of the first-team players were chosen from the Purdue Boilermakers, including quarterback Mike Phipps and running backs Perry Williams and Leroy Keyes, the latter of whom was the only player unanimously chosen for the All-Big Ten team.

Offensive selections

Quarterbacks
 Mike Phipps, Purdue (AP-1; UPI-2)
 Harry Gonso, Indiana (AP-2; UPI-1)

Running backs
 Leroy Keyes, Purdue (AP-1; UPI-1)
 Ron Johnson, Michigan (AP-1; UPI-1)
 Perry Williams, Purdue (AP-1; UPI-1 [fullback])
 Richard "Chico" Kurzowski, Northwestern (AP-2; UPI-2)
 Silas McKinnie, Iowa (AP-2; UPI-2 [fullback])
 Jack Isenbarger, Indiana (AP-2; UPI-2)

Ends
 Jim Beirne, Purdue (AP-1; UPI-1)
 John Wright, Illinois (AP-1)
 Billy Anders, Ohio State (UPI-1)
 Al Bream, Iowa (AP-2)
 Jim Berline, Michigan (AP-2)
 Charlie Sanders, Minnesota (UPI-2)
 John Wright, Illinois (UPI-2)

Tackles
  John Williams, Minnesota (AP-1; UPI-1)
 Dick Himes, Ohio State (AP-1; UPI-1)
 Joe Przbyycki, Michigan State (AP-2; UPI-2)
 Chuck Kuzneski, Purdue (AP-2)
 David Foley, Ohio State (UPI-2)

Guards
 Bruce Gunstra, Northwestern (AP-1; UPI-1)
 Gary Cassells, Indiana (AP-1; UPI-1)
 Bob Russell, Indiana (AP-2)
 Bob Sebeck, Purdue (AP-2; UPI-2)
 Ray Phillips, Michigan (UPI-2)

Centers
 Joe Dayton, Michigan (AP-1; UPI-1 )
 Jack Rudney, Northwestern (AP-2; UPI-2)

Defensive selections

Ends
 Bob Stein, Minnesota (AP-1; UPI-1)
 George Olion, Purdue (AP-2; UPI-1)
 George Chatlos, Michigan State (AP-1; UPI-2)
 Bob Holmes, Purdue (UPI-2)
 Cal Snowden, Indiana (AP-2)

Tackles
 McKinley Boston, Minnesota (AP-1; UPI-1)
 Lance Olssen, Purdue (AP-2; UPI-1)
 Tom Domres, Wisconsin (AP-1; UPI-2)
 Doug Crusan, Indiana (AP-2; UPI-2)

Middle guard
 Chuck Kyle, Purdue (AP-1; UPI-1)
 Ed Duren, Minnesota (UPI-2)
 Dennis Morgan, Michigan (AP-2)

Linebackers
 Ken Criter, Wisconsin (AP-1; UPI-1)
 Dick Marvel, Purdue (AP-2; UPI-1)
 Ken Kaczmarek, Indiana (AP-1)
 Jim Sinodecki, Indiana (AP-1)
 Tom Stincic, Michigan (UPI-1)
 Dirk Worden, Ohio State (AP-2; UPI-2
 Noel Jenke, Minnesota (UPI-2)
 Terry Miller, Illinois (AP-2)
 Dennis Morgan, Michigan (UPI-2)

Defensive backs
 Ron Bess, Illinois (AP-1; UPI-1)
 Tom Garretson, Northwestern (AP-1; UPI-1 [safety])
 Tom Sakal, Minnesota (AP-1; UPI-1)
 Ted Provost, Ohio State (AP-2; UPI-2)
 Steve Wilson, Iowa (AP-2; UPI-2 [safety])
 Tom Foley, Purdue (UPI-2)
 George Hoey, Michigan (AP-2)

Key
AP = Associated Press, selected by a "board of sportswriters covering the Big Ten scene"

UPI = United Press International, selected by the conference coaches

Bold = Consensus first-team selection of both the AP and UPI

See also
1967 College Football All-America Team

References

All-Big Ten Conference
All-Big Ten Conference football teams